Coming of Age is a 2015 German-South African-Mosotho documentary drama film directed by Teboho Edkins and co-produced by Don Edkins for Steps and Teboho Edkins for Deutsche Film-und Fernsehakademie Berlin (dffb). The film revolves around four Basotho teenagers: Lefa, Senate, Retabile and Mosaku; over the course of two years as they grow up in the village of Ha Sekake.

The film made its premier in February 2015 in Germany. The film received mixed reviews from critics and screened at many film festivals. In 2015, the director won the Biberstein Gusmao Award for the Best Emerging Director at the 2015 Porto/Post/Doc. At the 2015 Berlin International Film Festival, the film was nominated for the Crystal Bear Award for the Generation 14plus - Best Film. In the same year, the film was nominated for the Tanit d'Or for the Documentary Feature Film Carthage Film Festival. In 2016 the film was again nominated for the EVA - Excellence in Visual Anthropology Award at the Ethnocineca.

References

External links 
 

2015 films
South African drama films
German drama films
Lesotho drama films
2010s German films